A tudun was a governor resident in a town or other settlement in the ancient Bulgar, Avar or Gokturk empires, particularly those of the Bulgars and the Khazars. The tudun was the personal representative of the imperial government and could function both as an administrator and a diplomat. At times, a tudun would be appointed for a town nominally under another power's control but de facto within the sphere of influence of the tudun's khagan.

History of the Turkic peoples
Khazar titles
Titles of the Göktürks